The Hawaii elepaio (Chasiempis sandwichensis), also Hawaiian elepaio, is a monarch flycatcher found on the Big Island of Hawaii.  Until 2010, all three elepaio species, the Kauaʻi ʻelepaio (C. sclateri), the Oʻahu ʻelepaio (C. ibidis) and this species were considered conspecific.

Taxonomy and systematics
The Hawaii elepaio was originally classified in the genus Muscicapa.

Subspecies
The three subspecies on the Big Island differ in their ecological requirements and head coloration (see also Gloger's Rule):
 C. s. sandwichensis - (Gmelin, 1789): The Kona elepaio. It differs from the volcano subspecies by having the forehead and the supercilium whitish with some rusty feathers. It inhabits mesic forest characterized by koa (Acacia koa) and ōhia lehua (Metrosideros polymorpha); its population seems to be stable at about 60,000–65,000.
 C. s. ridgwayi - Stejneger, 1887: The volcano elepaio. Originally described as a separate species. This is the most common subspecies today, with a population of around 100,000–150,000, or more than half of the total number of elepaio. It is a bird of the rainforest, which on Hawaii are characterized by ōhia lehua and hāpuu (Cibotium tree ferns).
 C. s. bryani - Pratt, 1979: The Mauna Kea elepaio. It is only found in the māmane (Sophora chrysophylla ) – naio (Myoporum sandwicense) dry forest on the leeward slopes of Mauna Kea. It has the entire head heavily washed with white. Due to destruction of most of its habitat, it is the rarest Big Island subspecies, with a population of 2,000–2,500 birds.

References

External links

Species factsheet - BirdLife International

Chasiempis
Endemic birds of Hawaii
Biota of Hawaii (island)
Birds described in 1789
Taxa named by Johann Friedrich Gmelin